The 1573  was the last stand of the Azai clan, one of Oda Nobunaga's chief opponents. and the first battle of Oda Nobutada.

Prelude
In September, 1573, Oda Nobunaga defeated the Asakura clan at the Siege of Ichijodani Castle. Later, the Oda forces returned to northern Ōmi, and on October, 1573, Nobunaga began attacking Odani Castle, devastating the Azai clan.

Siege
Nobunaga took Odani Castle from Azai Nagamasa, who, left with no other option, committed suicide along with his father. Azai knew from the beginning that he would lose the battle, so he gave his wife Oichi (Nobunaga's sister), and their three daughters back to Nobunaga, saving them from death. Two of Nagamasa's daughters would later marry into powerful families. Their escape from the besieged castle became a fairly common sentimental scene in traditional Japanese art.

Aftermath
Before Azai Nagamasa committed seppuku he decided to make one last attack on Nobunaga's main camp; in the end, however, he failed and was instead captured. Nagamasa suffered much the same fate as his comrade-in-arms Asakura Yoshikage, whose castle at Oda Nobunaga's Siege of Ichijodani Castle was set aflame and destroyed.

In popular culture
The battle has been featured in the game Samurai Warriors 2. In the game, however, both the Azai and Asakura clans are destroyed during the Odani siege. Historically, the Asakura clan was destroyed before the Azai at the Battle of Ichijodani.

See also
Battle of Anegawa
Siege of Ichijodani Castle

References

1573 in Japan
Odani 1573
Odani 1573
Conflicts in 1573
Odani Castle
Odani Castle
Azai clan